Gleb Yurievich (died 1171), Prince of Kursk (1147), Kanev (1149), Pereyaslavl (1155–1169) and Grand Prince of Kiev (Kyiv, 1169-1170, 1170–1171). He was a son of Yuri Dolgorukiy.

In popular culture 

He appears in Louis L'Amour's historical novel The Walking Drum.

References 

Year of birth missing
1171 deaths
Grand Princes of Kiev
Yurievichi family
Rurik dynasty
12th-century princes in Kievan Rus'
Eastern Orthodox monarchs
Princes of Pereyaslavl
People of Cuman descent